"I Just Thought You'd Like to Know" is a song originally recorded by Johnny Cash. It was written for him by Charlie Rich.

The song was recorded by Cash in July 1958 during his final sessions for Sun Records. and released as a single (Sun 309, with "It's Just About Time", another song from the same sessions, on the opposite side) in November.

Background 

"I Just Thought You'd Like to Know" only made it to number 85 on the  Billboard Hot 100, with only a one-week stay there, and didn't enter the Billboard country chart, while "It's Just About Time" reached number 30 on the country chart and number 47 on the Hot 100. John M. Alexander (in his book The Man in Song: A Discographic Biography of Johnny Cash) notes that as a good result (achieved "despite all the attention surrounding" Cash's second Columbia single, "Don't Take Your Guns to Town", the Sun single was released "on the heels of"), while Peter Lowry (in his book I've Been Everywhere: A Johnny Cash Chronicle) says that "compared to [Cash's] recent singles this could be seen as a flop chartwise."

Charts

References 

Johnny Cash songs
1958 singles
Songs written by Charlie Rich
Sun Records singles
1958 songs